Alanus de Rupe (also Alan, Alain de la Roche, or Blessed Alain de la Roche); (c. 1428 – 8 September 1475) was a Roman Catholic theologian noted for his views on prayer. Some writers claim him as a native of Germany, others of Belgium; but his disciple, Cornelius Sneek, says that he was born in Brittany. He died at Zwolle.

Life
Born in Dinan, Brittany in around 1428, he entered the Dominican Order in 1459 at age thirty-one. While pursuing his studies at Saint Jacques, Paris, he distinguished himself in philosophy and theology. From 1459 to 1475 he taught almost uninterruptedly at Paris, Lille, Douay, Ghent, and Rostock in Germany, where, in 1473, he was made Master of Sacred Theology. During his sixteen years of teaching he became a most renowned preacher. He was indefatigable in what he regarded as his special mission, the preaching and re-establishment of the Rosary, which he did with success throughout northern France, Flanders, and the Netherlands.  He established a Confraternity of the Psalter of the Glorious Virgin Mary, around 1470 which was instrumental in disseminating the rosary throughout Europe. 

Alanus published nothing during his lifetime, but immediately after his death the brethren of his province were commanded to collect his writings for publication. These were edited at different times and have occasioned some controversy among scholars. A list of writings attributed to Alanus was compiled by J. G. T. Graesse in Trésor des livres rares et précieux (1859).

Alanus on Dominic and the Rosary
According to an old Dominican tradition, during the time of the Albigensians in southern France in the latter part of the 12th and the beginning of the 13th centuries, Dominic was distressed at his lack of success in his preaching in countering their teachings, and turned to the Mother of God for help. She reportedly appeared to him and told him to use her Psalter in conjunction with his preaching, as an instrument in combatting the great heresy of his day. The Marian Psalter, (a custom of praying 150 "Aves" rather than Psalms) developed into the Rosary.

The tradition of Alanus de Rupe's revelation concerning Dominic receiving the Rosary was generally accepted until the 17th century when the Bollandists concluded that the account of Dominic's supposed apparition of Our Lady of the Rosary is not mentioned in any documents of the Church or Dominican Order prior to the writings of Blessed Alanus over two hundred years later. 

Alanus' descriptions of the visions and sermons of Dominic, supposed to have been revealed to him in 1460, are, according to Bishop John T. McNicholas O.P., not to be regarded as historical. Some of Alanus' more colorful accounts have been attributed to oratorical imaginings designed to enliven sermons. While granting that Alanus de Rupe was a pious and learned person, Herbert Thurston held that his visions were those of an individual "deluded" and "a victim of the most astounding hallucinations". While conceding that Alanus was a very earnest and devout man, Thurston also says that he based his revelations on the imaginary testimony of writers that never existed.

According to Alanus, the Blessed Virgin Mary reportedly made fifteen specific promises to Christians who pray the rosary. The fifteen rosary promises range from protection from misfortune to meriting a high degree of glory in heaven. A commonly printed pamphlet of the promises carries the imprimatur of Patrick J. Hayes who was Archbishop of New York from 1919 to 1938. The pamphlet may possibly be an excerpt from an earlier work carrying Hayes’ imprimatur. Such an imprimatur would have been issued following the issuance of a "nihil obstat" (meaning nothing obstructs) by a censor who reviewed the material to determine if it contradicted Catholic teaching. Under the rules of Canon Law, neither a "nihil obstat" nor an "imprimatur" would necessarily reflect the personal opinion of either the censor or the archbishop regarding the document reviewed. It was Hayes' predecessor, John Cardinal Farley, who issued an imprimatur for the edition of the Catholic Encyclopedia that holds the rosary promises as not historical.

Notes

Further reading
 Winston-Allen, Anne. Stories of the Rose
 Huizinga, Johan, The Waning of the Middle Ages, Chapter, "Religious Sensibility and Imagination"

External links
 De dignitate et utilitate psalterii praecelsae ac intemeratae semper virginis Mariae http://www.ub.uni-kiel.de/digiport/bis1800/typboliste.html
Quodlibet de veritate fraternitatis rosarii seu psalterii beatae Mariae Virginis.

1428 births
1475 deaths
French Dominicans
French beatified people
15th-century venerated Christians
15th-century Christian mystics
Roman Catholic mystics